En Uyir Nee Thaane is a 1998 Indian Tamil-language romantic drama film, directed by S. P. Rajkumar. The film stars Prabhu and Devayani. It is a remake of Telugu film Pellichesukundam. The film released on 19 October 1998 to mixed reviews.

Plot
Vasu is a rich industrialist who raises his father's illegitimate son after the death of its mother. His father opposes this. Vasu leaves home to live alone with the child. Janaki witnesses a murder and testifies against the murderer. He is convicted. The murderer's brother rapes Janaki in revenge, and Janaki is kicked out of her house by her brother. She goes to her friend's house, but even there, she is kicked out. Vasu comes to her rescue. Janaki becomes a mother for Vasu's illegitimate brother and manager in Vasu's mill. Vasu is drawn towards her and wants to marry her. She turns him down, believing he is doing so out of sympathy. Vasu's mother tells Janaki to say no to Vasu's proposal for marriage as her aunt's daughter is coming from the US, and she wants Vasu to marry her instead. Janaki agrees and asks Prabhu to marry Maheswari instead. Janaki's rapist tries to marry her to make her withdraw the case, and then kill her. Vasu saves her. Finally, Maheshwari realizes Vasu's love for Janaki and refuses to marry him. Vasu and Janaki are united.

Cast

Soundtrack
Music was composed by Deva. The audio contains five songs. Lyrics were written by Pazhani Bharathi, Kamakodiyan, Arivumathi and S. P. Rajkumar.

Reception
Critic Thamarai Manalan of Dinakaran wrote "there is full scope for Prabu and Devayani in this film to exhibit their exceptional acting talent", and that "both of them have performed remarkably well". The critic added that "after very long days, Prabu has achieved very great feat in acting, by completely melting down where the situation demands it and has emotionally burst out also where he would naturally be expected to do so". Critic Sandya Krishna of Indolink.com wrote "if Rajkumar had been willing to make a strong statement in favor of rape victims living and enjoying the rest of their lives despite societal scrutiny, En Uyir Nee Thaanae could have become a classic. But he settles for the usual masala and stereotypical approach which makes the film appear flawed and incomplete".

References

1998 films
1998 romantic drama films
Tamil remakes of Telugu films
1990s Tamil-language films
Films scored by Deva (composer)
Indian romantic drama films
Films directed by S. P. Rajkumar